James E. Simon (born March 22, 1940) is a former American football offensive lineman who played for the Detroit Lions and Atlanta Falcons of the National Football League (NFL). He played college football at the University of Miami.

References

1940 births
Living people
American football offensive guards
American football offensive tackles
Miami Hurricanes football players
Detroit Lions players
Atlanta Falcons players
Players of American football from Pittsburgh